Willard Cable Prentiss (10 December 1897 – 1 October 1959) was an American racecar driver. He was born in Denver, Colorado.

As well as two appearances in the Indianapolis 500, Prentiss competed in various races across the United States in the 1920s, including races at Cedar Rapids, Iowa and Sterling, Illinois.

In 1927, Prentiss competed in the Annual Fall Auto Races at Oakley, Kansas. A win in the ten mile (16 km) race was followed up by second place in the  race, despite having a flat tire for the last three laps. He competed there again in 1928, taking joint second place in the one mile (1.6 km) time trial and third place in the  race.

In 1930, Prentiss was leading a race at the Arizona State Fair, Phoenix, Arizona when his car went through a fence and he sustained serious injuries.

1933 saw Prentiss racing in the Indianapolis 500, driving a Rigling-Duesenberg car owned by Jack Carr. He finished on the lead lap in 13th place, and won $450 in prize money. In 1934, he entered the Indianapolis 500 again. He practiced with two cars, but was not fast enough in qualification to be able to start the race.

Indy 500 results

Footnotes

1897 births
1959 deaths
Indianapolis 500 drivers
Racing drivers from Denver